Wallace Handley Bristowe (27 April 1922 – 1 March 2013) was  a former Australian rules footballer who played with Hawthorn and Fitzroy in the Victorian Football League (VFL).

Personal life
Bristowe served as a sergeant in the Royal Australian Air Force during the Second World War.

Notes

External links 		
		
		
		
		
		
		
		
1922 births		
2013 deaths		
Australian rules footballers from Victoria (Australia)		
Hawthorn Football Club players		
Fitzroy Football Club players
People from Myrtleford
Royal Australian Air Force personnel of World War II
Royal Australian Air Force airmen